Crystal Lake is located in Silver Lake, Ohio. It is one of the two man made lakes in the village.

References

Reservoirs in Ohio
Bodies of water of Summit County, Ohio